White Music is the fourth studio album by American rock band Crack the Sky, released on LP in 1980 (see 1980 in music) by Lifesong Records (catalog #LS 8028). It was the first release from the newly reformed Crack the Sky, whose lineup included only two members from the original band: singer/songwriter John Palumbo and guitarist Rick Witkowski.

Track listing

Bonus tracks on the 2001 CD version
"Hot Razors" (f2) – 4:53
by Feed da Cat 2, John Palumbo (guitars, voice) and Ian Palumbo (drums), with Ronnie Zebron (lead guitar)
"Poptown" (demo) – 1:37
"A Girl Like Mom" – 4:06
"She's So Clean" – 3:47
note: on the 2001 CD, "Hot Razors" and "Poptown" are the first two tracks on the CD, and "A Girl Like Mom" and "She's So Clean" are the last two.

Personnel

The band
John Palumbo — Lead vocal, guitars, bass guitar, piano
Rick Witkowski — Guitars, drums, IBM Selectric II, back-up vocals
Vince DePaul – Synthesizer, electronic keyboards

Additional musicians
Deborah Kucan – Back-up vocals ("Techni Generation")
Richard Hunt – Back-up vocals ("Techni Generation")
Robin Denning – The orchestra
Crack Pack Horns
Bill Warfield – trumpet
Tom McCormick – tenor saxophone
Ellery Eskellin – baritone saxophone

Production
Terence P. Minogue – Producer
Rick Witkowski – Producer
Jeffrey Sharp — Executive producer
Victor Giordano – Engineer
Ted Jensen — Mastering
Elliott Federman – Remastering (2001 CD)

Additional credits
Jeffery Sharp – Protection
Terence P. Minogue – String arrangement
Recorded at Flite III Recorders, Baltimore, Maryland
Mastered at Sterling Sound, New York City
LSR Strings — Acoustic guitar strings
John Palumbo – Album concept
Consuelo Y. Regan – Album design
Special thanks: Richard Klotzman, J. DeCesare, Gordon Miller Music, Belli Music, Inc., The Bel Loc (Bill Doxanas), Frank Ayd III and all at Flite III, Cindy Markus, Darrell Grysko for the demo recordings at the Attic, Mary, Kook's, Julie, Jane and Our Families
Recorded ZenLabs, New Jersey, 2001 ("Hot Razors" (f2))
Amy Bennick — Art direction (2001 CD)
Rick Sapphire — Photography (2001 CD
Remastered at SAJE Sound, New York City

Alternate versions
In 1988, Lifesong released a CD pairing White Music with Crack the Sky on a single disc (LSCD-8801). To fit both albums on one CD, the songs "The Radio Cries" and "Flying" (and one track from Crack the Sky) were omitted. In 2001, a remastered CD of White Music was released (Lifesong LSCD-7001). It included four bonus tracks: a 2001 re-recording of "Hot Razors in My Heart" by Palumbo and his son Ian, a demo version of "Poptown", and two outtakes—"A Girl Like Mom" and "She's So Clean".

Sources
LP and CD liner notes

External links
Official site

1980 albums
Crack the Sky albums